Victor Zhenchenko Віктор Васильович Женченко (11 October 1936 – 28 October 2021) was a Ukrainian poet, translator and singer. Since 1965 he worked in the Donetsk Opera and Ballet Theater.

Education 
Graduated from Kharkiv National Kotlyarevsky University of Arts.

Awards
 Winner of the literary prize of Andriy Malyshko.
Honored Artist of the Ukrainian SSR
 Recipient of the title of Merited Artist of Ukraine

References

General references
 Victor Zhenchenko brief biography
 «I stick to music, poetry and Friends»
 Victor Zhenchenko Snow on green leaves
 Victor Zhenchenko -Do not hide your eyes
 "Two wings" work of Victor Zhenchenka

External Links
 

Recipients of the title of Merited Artist of Ukraine
Ukrainian male poets
1936 births
2021 deaths
People from Poltava Oblast